Rafael Yunier Alba Castillo (born 12 August 1993) is a Cuban taekwondo athlete.

He competed at the 2016 Summer Olympics in Rio de Janeiro, in the men's +80 kg.

At the 2020 Summer Olympics, he won the bronze medal in the men's +80 kg event.

References

External links

1993 births
Living people
Cuban male taekwondo practitioners
Olympic taekwondo practitioners of Cuba
Taekwondo practitioners at the 2016 Summer Olympics
Pan American Games medalists in taekwondo
Pan American Games gold medalists for Cuba
Pan American Games silver medalists for Cuba
Taekwondo practitioners at the 2015 Pan American Games
Taekwondo practitioners at the 2019 Pan American Games
World Taekwondo Championships medalists
Medalists at the 2015 Pan American Games
Medalists at the 2019 Pan American Games
Taekwondo practitioners at the 2020 Summer Olympics
Medalists at the 2020 Summer Olympics
Olympic medalists in taekwondo
Olympic bronze medalists for Cuba
21st-century Cuban people